The French Intellectual Property Code (IPC; French: Code de la propriété intellectuelle), is a corpus of law relating to intellectual and industrial property. It was formalised by Law No 92-597 of 1 July 1992, replacing earlier laws relating to industrial property and artistic and literary property.

The code is frequently modified: two major modifications are known as the DADVSI law and the HADOPI law.

See also
French copyright law
National Institute of Industrial Property (France)

External links
  Text of the code on Légifrance

French intellectual property law
Intellectual property law